Catherine Shepherd (28 October 1901 – 18 February 1976) was an Australian writer. She wrote for journals, stage and radio – short stories, plays and serials.

Early life and education 
Born in Enkeldoorn, Southern Rhodesia (now Chivhu, Zimbabwe) on 28 October 1901, Catherine Shepherd was the daughter of Margaret and Edgar David Shepherd. Her father, a Church of England minister, died when she was very young, leaving her mother with little to support them. Returning to England, the pair lived with relations in Yorkshire. Shepherd was educated locally and then at Howell's School in Denbigh, Wales before graduating from the University College London with a BA in English in 1923 and then completing a DipEd.

Career 
In the mid-1930s Shepherd contributed short stories to The Australian Woman's Mirror. 

In 1938 Shepherd taught English at the Collegiate School in Hobart. She had previously been an assistant teacher in Adelaide, Sydney and Bathurst when she applied to the Tasmanian Teachers and Schools Registration Board for certification.

Her first play, Daybreak, was broadcast on ABC Radio in May 1938 before its stage premiere at the Theatre Royal, Hobart in July of the same year.

In 1946 her radio serial, Children of Magpie Gully, was broadcast by 2FC, replacing Gwen Meredith's Anderson Place in the time-slot.

Death 
Shepherd died at St Ann's Rest Home in Hobart on 18 February 1976. Her remains were cremated. She left her AU$58,353 estate to St Ann's.

Selected works 

 Daybreak
 Jane, My Love
 Delphiniums

References 

1901 births
1976 deaths
20th-century Australian women writers
20th-century Australian dramatists and playwrights
Alumni of University College London
People from Chivhu